In Our Time is a 1982 Taiwanese anthology film directed by Edward Yang, Yi Chang, Ko I-Chen and Tao Te-Chen. The film's four vignettes each take place in a different decade between 1950 and 1980 and depict characters at different points in their lives. The film deals with a range of dramatic, comic, economic and social themes.

The first two episodes are described as contemplative and dream-inspired, while the latter two episodes feature more dialogue and overt comedy. The first segment, translated as "Dinosaurs" or "Little Dragon Head" is directed by Tao and follows a young boy who escapes from parental neglect and ostracization by peers by retreating into a fantasy world populated by his dinosaur toys. The second segment, "Expectations" or "Desires", is directed by Yang and stars Shi Anni as a teenage girl who becomes infatuated with an older man who is living at their house as a renter, but falls into a love triangle. The third segment, "Leapfrog" is directed by Ko and follows a college student who deals with the pressures of life by trying to start a club and organize a competition. The final segment, translated as "Show your ID" or "Say Your Name"me is directed by Yi Chang and stars Sylvia Chang. It follows a newly-married couple who are accidentally locked out of their home and barred from entering their workplace, to comedic effect.

The film was produced by the Central Motion Picture Corporation, which had a reputation for conservative filmmaking. Yang's segment was his second filmed work, after a TV movie he directed the previous year. Writing in his eponymous book on Edward Yang, John Anderson described Yang's segment as bringing "an almost documentary content to the Taiwanese feature, which is counterbalanced in Expectations by Yang's decidedly poetic rhythms". The Harvard Film Archive described the film as "eschew[ing] studio-bound escapism and melodrama in favor of a hard-hitting cinema grounded in everyday life". The film is sometimes cited as the foundational film of the New Taiwan Cinema.

Plot

Little Dragon Head (29 mins)
A shy taciturn young boy called Hsiao-mao (Little Cat) leads an unhappy life. At home, his parents neglect him, favoring his little brother and chiding him for playing with his dinosaur toys instead of studying. At school, he is ostracized by his classmates, who play pranks on him. When Hsiao-mao's parents receive a radio from a wealthier couple, the family starts visiting them for tea and to watch television. At the couple's home, Hsiao-mao draws a picture of his T-Rex figurine, but the couple's young daughter of a similar age takes it as hers. Returning home, Hsiao-mao dreams of himself playing jovially with dinosaurs, accompanied by apes playing instruments. One day during recess at school, Hsiao-mao stares at a popular girl at school as she walks towards and past him, a sight that causes further teasing from other students and him fighting with them. That afternoon, his father throws his T-Rex figurine away and they visit the couple's home again. This time, without his toy, Hsiao-mao has nothing to draw, but the girl proposes that they sneak out to the garbage dump to find the figurine. They manage to return home with the figurine without anyone's notice, and Hsiao-mao draws a picture of the girl clutching the figurine. That night, it is revealed that the couple and the girl are flying somewhere, and it is unclear when a reunion will happen again. The vignette is bookeneded by shots of a record player playing a record.

Expectation (29 mins)
Hsiao-fen, a forlorn teenage girl, lives with her mother and older sister, who can neither get accepted into college nor is willing to find a job. Her father died some years ago, and to make ends meet, they rent out a room to single women, but they leave as soon as they are about to get married. Meanwhile, seeing her sister undress one night for bed seems to trigger a sexual awakening in her, and she learns to ride a bike with a younger cousin. One day, a new tenant arrives - a male college student, and the girls quickly develop a crush for him, intensified in a scene where they watch him carry bricks while shirtless. One night, Hsiao-fen tries to approach him for homework help, but through his window, she watches him and his older sister in bed. As she leaves her house, her cousin rides up to her, having learned how to bike by himself. He tries to entertain her with all of the things they can do now that they can ride a bike, but she seems uninterested. When he rides off, he quickly falls and tells Hsiao-fen that while he can now go to many places, he suddenly feels like he doesn't know where to go. Hsiao-fen helps him up and they walk home while the cousin envisions playing on his high school basketball team in the future.

Leapfrog (31 mins)
Tu Shih-lien (nicknamed Fatty) is a male college student who owns a frog and is somewhat dissatisfied with life. He tries to liven things up by setting up an international student's club after his previous club collapsed and working as a weekend driver. One night, he takes dinner to a hung-over tenant, Ms. Chang, and quickly develops a crush on her. His father, a real estate company owner, wants him to transfer to major in architecture and inherit his position, but Fatty is only interested in philosophy and computer science. Meanwhile, other students cannot help him set up his activity so he vents his anger by swimming vigorously in a river during a downpour. Later, he confronts the student responsible for approving activities, who approves his club, on the condition that this time, the Chinese students will defeat the international students in a competition, which they lost the last time, and win back honor. On the day of the competition, both Fatty and a friend run for election to represent the Chinese students in a swimming competition, but Fatty's friend receives one more vote than him. While driving his friend to the competition site, Fatty's motorcycle crashes and Fatty's friend is injured. Though without mental preparation, Fatty agrees to participate in place of his friend in a competition that consists of one section of swimming, one section of running with a flag, one section of swimming, and a final section of running, with the first person planting the flag the winner. On the last stretch, Fatty trails behind an international student, but only then does the international student realize that he had inadvertently grabbed the wrong flag, and thus Fatty wins. As the students celebrate, Ms. Chang throws him a bouquet of flowers.

Say Your Name (21 mins)
A young couple has just moved into a new apartment and the place is a mess, not to mention that a man with a constantly barking dog lives next door. After an argument, the wife leaves for her first day of work. The husband goes down to his mailbox to get his newspaper, but gets into an argument with a man who doesn't recognize the new resident and claims that the newspaper is his. Meanwhile, two kids going to school tell the boyfriend that they closed the door for him, and without a key, the husband is locked outside of his apartment. The husband approaches neighbors for help, but to no avail, and, with only a pair of underwear on and a towel around his waist, is forced to go out onto the street and call his girlfriend's company on a payphone, but cannot find her because the wife had arrived at the company but had left her company ID at home and is barred from entering. On her way home to get her ID, the wife gets stuck in traffic and decides to get out of her taxi and run home. The husband tries to scale an exterior wall to get into his apartment, but is mistaken by neighbors as a thief, including the dog owner, who hits him and causes him to fall to the ground. The wife arrives in time with the apartment key and the misunderstandings are resolved. The couple can live out a relatively peaceful life.

References

External links

1982 films
Films directed by Edward Yang
Taiwanese anthology films